The Perth Australia Temple is the 106th operating temple of the Church of Jesus Christ of Latter-day Saints (LDS Church).

It is located at 163–173 Wordsworth Avenue, Yokine, Western Australia, which is a suburb of Perth, Western Australia. The temple serves approximately 12,000 members in the area.

History
Previously members had to travel a distance equivalent to going from Los Angeles to New York City in order to attend the nearest temple in Sydney. Local reaction to the temple was favorable. LDS Church leaders received letters from both the Governor and the Premier of Western Australia expressing their confidence that the temple would be a positive influence on the community.

Approximately 37,000 visitors toured the temple during the open house, held 28 April–12 May 2001. LDS Church president Gordon B. Hinckley dedicated the temple on 20 May 2001.

In 2020, the Perth Australia Temple was closed in response to the coronavirus pandemic.

See also

 Comparison of temples of The Church of Jesus Christ of Latter-day Saints
 List of temples of The Church of Jesus Christ of Latter-day Saints
 List of temples of The Church of Jesus Christ of Latter-day Saints by geographic region
 Temple architecture (Latter-day Saints)
 The Church of Jesus Christ of Latter-day Saints in Australia

References

External links
 Official Perth Australia Temple page
 Perth Australia Temple at ChurchofJesusChristTemples.org

21st-century Latter Day Saint temples
Religious buildings and structures in Perth, Western Australia
Temples (LDS Church) completed in 2001
Temples (LDS Church) in Australia
2001 establishments in Australia